This is a list of waterfalls in the U.S. State of Colorado.


Waterfalls of Colorado
The following list includes all 81 waterfalls in Colorado that have official names according to the United States Geological Survey. There are also numerous unnamed waterfalls in the state.

See also

Hydrology
List of rivers in Colorado

References

External links

 State of Colorado website
 Colorado Division of Natural Resources
 Colorado Geological Survey

 
Geography of Colorado
Lists of landforms of Colorado
Tourist attractions in Colorado
Colorado, List of waterfalls of